KMAT is an Ethnic Christian radio station licensed to Seadrift, Texas, broadcasting on 105.1 FM. KMAT broadcasts in the languages of Spanish, Vietnamese, Cantonese, and Mandarin, and is owned by Cordell Communications, Inc.

References

External links
KMAT's Spanish language website
KMAT's Vietnamese language website
KMAT's Cantonese and Mandarin website

Cantonese-language radio stations
Chinese-American culture in Texas
MAT
Mandarin-language radio stations
MAT
MAT
Calhoun County, Texas